Gobeyr-e Do (also known as Gobeyr-e Bozorq, Gobeyr-e Dovvom, and Kūt al Qubair) is a village in Anaqcheh Rural District, in the Central District of Ahvaz County, Khuzestan Province, Iran. At the 2006 census, its population was 637, in 126 families.

References 

Populated places in Ahvaz County